Doylesport is an extinct town in Barton County, in the U.S. state of Missouri.

The community most likely has the name of the local Doyle family. A post office called Doylesport was established in 1868, and remained in operation until 1877. Besides the post office, Doylesport had a schoolhouse.

References

Ghost towns in Missouri
Unincorporated communities in Barton County, Missouri
Unincorporated communities in Missouri